Philip Matthew Hannan (May 20, 1913 – September 29, 2011) was an American prelate of the Roman Catholic Church. He served as auxiliary bishop of the Archdiocese of Washington from 1956 to 1965 and as the eleventh archbishop of the Archdiocese of New Orleans in Louisiana from 1965 to 1988.

Biography

Early life 
Philip Hannan was born on May 20, 1913, in Washington, D.C. His father, Patrick Francis Hannan, immigrated to the United States at age 18 and was nicknamed "The Boss". His mother was Lillian Hannan. Patrick Hannan found work as a plumber, building his trade into a flourishing business that weathered even the Great Depression. 

Philip Hannan attended St. John's College High School in Washington. He captained the winning cadet company in his senior year there. Before high school graduation, he surprised his family by saying that instead of taking the entrance exam to gain admittance into the U.S. Military Academy at West Point, he would become a priest. He then began college studies at St. Charles College in Catonsville, Maryland, and then at the Sulpician Seminary at the Catholic University of America in Washington, D.C.

After graduating from Catholic University in 1936 with a master's degree, Hannan traveled to Rome to study at the Pontifical North American College in Rome. Hannan received a Licentiate of Thelogy from the Pontifical Gregorian University in Rome and later earned a Doctor of Canon Law degree from Catholic University.

Priesthood 
While in Rome, Hannan was ordained a priest of the Archdiocese of Baltimore-Washington by Ralph Hayes on December 8, 1939.

In the summer of 1940, due to World War II, all American seminarians were ordered to leave Italy by the U.S. Secretary of State, prompting Hannan to return to Washington. He would later write a book, Rome: Living under the Axis, detailing his experiences under the Fascist Regime in Italy.

After returning to Washington, Hannan was assigned as curate at St. Thomas Aquinas Parish in Baltimore, Maryland.

World War II 
After the entry of the United States into World War II, Hannan joined the United States Army and was commissioned as an officer and chaplain to the 82nd Airborne Division.  He ministered to the paratroopers during the fighting in the Ardennes Offensive in Belgium.  Hannan witnessed the liberation of starved prisoners at the Wöbbelin concentration camp in Ludwigslust, Germany.

After his discharge from the army, Hannan served briefly as pastor of Cologne Cathedral Parish in Cologne, Germany, during the American occupation.

After returning to Washington, Hannan was assigned as an assistant priest at Saint Mary Mother of God Parish. When the Archdiocese of Washington was split from the Archdiocese of Baltimore on November 15, 1947, Hannan was incardinated, or transferred to the Archdiocese of Washington.  In 1948, he was appointed vice chancellor of that archdiocese.  While he was vice chancellor, Hannan met then Congressman John F. Kennedy.  For the next 14 years, Hannan would serve as a unofficial advisor to Kennedy on matters of religion and social justices.

In 1951, Hannan established the Catholic Standard in Washington and served as its editor-in-chief. Later that year he was named chancellor of the archdiocese, and Pope Pius XII honored Hannan in 1952 by naming him a monsignor.

Auxiliary Bishop of Washington 
Pope Pius XII named Hannan on June 16, 1956. as an auxiliary bishop of the Archdiocese of Washington and titular bishop of Hieropolis;  he was consecrated in the Cathedral of St. Matthew the Apostle on August 28, 1956. Hannan was part of the U.S. delegation to the Second Vatican Council, where he served as a press officer.

Hannan was in Rome for the Second Vatican Council in November 1963 when news reached him about the assassination of President  Kennedy, forcing his immediate return to Washington. At Kennedy's state funeral mass, Cardinal Richard Cushing was the principal celebrant. The Kennedy family asked Hannan to deliver the homily at the "low" or recited Requiem Mass. This responsibility normally would have fallen to the Archbishop of Washington at the time, Patrick O'Boyle, but he allowed Hannan to perform it.

Archbishop of New Orleans 
During the Fourth Session of Vatican II, specifically on September 29, 1965, Hannan was appointed as the eleventh archbishop of New Orleans, succeeding Archbishop John Cody (later Cardinal), who had been transferred to Chicago. He moved to New Orleans only weeks after Hurricane Betsy hit the city, and he became a spiritual leader during the rebuilding of both the city and the archdiocese.

He presided over the New Orleans archdiocese during a time of great change. The Second Vatican Council concluded on December 8, 1965, and Archbishop Hannan led the effort to implement the Council's policies of reform within the archdiocese. Hannan instituted a Social Apostolate program in 1966 which now provides over 20 million pounds of free food each year to 42,000 needy women, children and elderly. He also reformed the Archdiocesan Catholic Charities system, which now serves as the largest non-governmental social service agency in the New Orleans metropolitan area.

At the same time, the demographics of the city were changing, as Catholic whites moved to the suburbs, while Orleans Parish became increasingly Protestant. New churches and parishes were being built throughout the city, while attendance in inner-city churches declined.  At a time when other swimming pools in the New Orleans area were racially segregated, he opened the pool at Notre Dame Seminary to the entire public.

In 1968, Hannan returned to Washington from New Orleans to deliver the graveside eulogy for Senator Robert F. Kennedy.  Hannan was archbishop when Pope John Paul II made his apostolic visit to New Orleans between September 11 and 13, 1987, the first ever papal visit to the city. Hannan, who considered the visit the highlight of his tenure as Archbishop, was the Pontiff's personal guide throughout his three-day tour of the city.

Retirement 
In May 1988, upon reaching his 75th birthday,, Hannan submitted his resignation as Archbishop of Washington. This resignation was accepted by Pope John Paul II on December 6, 1988, when Hannan was succeeded as archbishop by Francis Schulte. 

In 1994 Hannan offered graveside prayers at the interment of Jacqueline Bouvier Kennedy Onassis in Arlington National Cemetery. During Hurricane Katrina in 2005, Hannan remained at a studio in a Catholic television station he had founded in Metairie, in order to protect it from looting. In the aftermath of Katrina, Hannan participated personally in the clean-up effort. In May 2010, Our Sunday Visitor Publishing published Hannan's memoirs in The Archbishop Wore Combat Boots – From Combat, to Camelot, to Katrina: A Memoir of an Extraordinary Life by Archbishop Philip Hannan with Nancy Collins and Peter Finney, Jr. .

Death and legacy 
Philip Hannan died on September 29, 2011, at the age of 98 at Chateau de Notre Dame. He had moved there, from his private residence in Covington, Louisiana, in June 2011; he had grown increasingly frail in his last months because of a series of strokes and other health problems.

Hannan received numerous civic honors, including the most prestigious award presented to a New Orleans civic leader, The Times-Picayune Loving Cup. In 1987, the Catholic University of America named its new science center Hannan Hall and conferred upon him the honorary Doctor of Laws. He also held an honorary Doctor of Laws from Georgetown University.

Viewpoints

Abortion rights 
In 1996, Hannan publicly opposed the election of Democrat Mary Landrieu, a Roman Catholic whose family had been Hannan's longtime friends, to the United States Senate. Although stopping short of endorsing (or even mentioning) Landrieu's Republican opponent, Woody Jenkins, the retired archbishop had become concerned, as he explained, by the endorsement of Landrieu by Emily's List. Hannan's 1996 declaration has been cited as influential on later Catholic prelates involving themselves in politics by issuing warning statements about pro-abortion rights Catholic politicians and in barring them from communion.

On November 27, 2008, from his home in Covington, the retired archbishop published his "Thanksgiving and Christmas Blessings" in the New Orleans Times-Picayune. The full-page announcement was mostly an anti-abortion appeal expressing particular concern over the potential threat that the "evil" Freedom of Choice Act might be passed into law by the incoming United States Congress and the administration of President Barack Obama. The ad cited the 1973 Supreme Court decision Roe v. Wade and, quoting the United States Conference of Catholic Bishops, warns that "a bad court decision will be enshrined in bad legislation that is more radical than the decision itself."

Nuclear arms 
Hannan was the leader of a minority of bishops who opposed the May 3, 1983, pastoral letter of the National Conference of Catholic Bishops entitled The Challenge of Peace: God's Promise and Our Response.  The letter opposed the concept of nuclear deterrence and advocated a nuclear freeze with the Soviet Union.

References

Sources
 Hannan, Philip, with Nancy Collins and Peter Finney, Jr. The Archbishop Wore Combat Boots – From Combat, to Camelot, to Katrina: A Memoir of an Extraordinary Life, hardcover, 457 pages, May 2010. Our Sunday Visitor Publishing (Huntington, Indiana); .
 Hannan, Philip. Rome: Living Under the Axis, May 2003; .

Further reading
 Finney, Peter. Clarion Herald. "Archbishop Hannan credits active aging to 'good genes'". Nov. 25, 1999.
 Finney, Peter. Clarion Herald. "Archbishop Hannan, 'Bearer of the Eucharist,' celebrates 60 years". Dec. 23, 1999.

1913 births
2011 deaths
Roman Catholic archbishops of New Orleans
20th-century Roman Catholic archbishops in the United States
American Roman Catholic clergy of Irish descent
Participants in the Second Vatican Council
United States Army chaplains
World War II chaplains
Catholic University of America alumni
Pontifical North American College alumni
Pontifical Gregorian University alumni
Roman Catholic activists
American anti-fascists
Military personnel from Washington, D.C.
Writers from Louisiana
Writers from Washington, D.C.
People from New Orleans
People associated with the assassination of John F. Kennedy